Bridge of Sighs is the second solo album by the English guitarist and songwriter Robin Trower. Released in 1974, it was his second album after leaving Procol Harum, and was a commercial breakthrough for Trower. Songs such as "Bridge of Sighs", "Too Rolling Stoned", "Day of the Eagle" and "Little Bit of Sympathy" became live concert staples.

History
The album was produced by organist Matthew Fisher, formerly Trower's bandmate in Procol Harum. Acclaimed Beatles engineer Geoff Emerick was this album's sound engineer.

In an interview with Guitar World, Trower explained how the album got its title. Robin said that he had had the first line of the song for years and one day saw some sport pages which listed a racehorse called Bridge of Sighs, which he thought would be a great title.

Bridge of Sighs was the second Trower release to feature cover art by "Funky" Paul Olsen. 

Bridge of Sighs (Chrysalis 1057) reached #7 in the United States during a chart stay of 31 weeks. It was certified Gold on 10 September 1974. Early printings of the original album cover had the front image upside-down and were more greenish in colour.

The title track was covered by Opeth for the special edition of their 2008 album, Watershed. Steve Lukather covered it for his 2021 album, I Found the Sun Again. A segment of it also appears as a hidden track on Metallica's 1998 cover album Garage Inc.

"Day of the Eagle" was covered by Billy Idol guitarist Steve Stevens on his third solo album Memory Crash (2008). Tesla also covered the song on their 2007 Real to Reel album as did Armored Saint on their Nod to the Old School record.

"Too Rolling Stoned" was covered by Drivin N Cryin with Warren Haynes for the 1995 Hempilation benefit compilation album. In 2017, UFO included the song on their covers album, The Salentino Cuts.

Track listing
All tracks composed by Robin Trower; except where indicated

Side one
"Day of the Eagle" – 4:59
"Bridge of Sighs" – 5:05
"In This Place" – 4:28
"The Fool and Me" (James Dewar, Robin Trower) – 3:57

Side two
"Too Rolling Stoned" – 7:29
"About to Begin" – 3:43
"Lady Love" (Dewar, Trower) – 3:21
"Little Bit of Sympathy" – 4:20

The album was remastered and remixed in 1999 with five bonus tracks recorded for KMET radio at The Record Plant in Los Angeles, California:

"Day of the Eagle" (recorded 29/5/74) – 3:48
"Bridge of Sighs" (recorded 29/5/74) – 5:16
"Too Rolling Stoned" (recorded 29/5/74) – 6:26
"Lady Love" (recorded 29/5/74) – 3:12
"Little Bit of Sympathy" (recorded 29/5/74) – 4:49

The album was remastered once again and released in 2007 with eight bonus tracks from BBC Radio 1's "John Peel Sessions":

"Bridge of Sighs" (recorded 5/3/74) – 4:54
"In This Place" (recorded 5/3/74) – 4:04
"Alethea" (recorded 5/3/74) – 3:55
"Little Bit of Sympathy" (recorded 5/3/74) – 3:52
"Fine Day" (recorded 28/1/75) – 3:22
"Confessin’ Midnight" (recorded 28/1/75) – 4:47
"It's Only Money" (recorded 28/1/75) – 5:01
"Gonna Be More Suspicious" (recorded 28/1/75) – 2:58

Personnel
Robin Trower – guitar
James Dewar – bass, vocals
Reg Isidore – drums

Additional Personnel 
Matthew Fisher – producer
Geoff Emerick – sound engineer

Charts

References

External links 
 Robin Trower - Bridge of Sighs (1974) album releases & credits at Discogs
 Robin Trower - Bridge of Sighs (1974, Remaster 2007) album to be listened on Spotify
 Robin Trower - Bridge of Sighs (1974, Remaster 2007) album to be listened on YouTube

1974 albums
Robin Trower albums
Albums produced by Matthew Fisher
Capitol Records albums
Chrysalis Records albums